The Gentlemen v Players first-class cricket fixture was first played in 1806 and, despite many difficulties in the early years, it had by 1840 become an established annual event in the English cricket calendar. Apart from the years of the two World Wars, it remained so until 1962. The purpose of the fixture was to match the best of the amateur cricketers (the Gentlemen) against the best of the paid professionals (the Players). The table below summarises the full career record in the fixture of everyone who made their debuts for the Gentlemen team in the matches played to 1840.

Key
 club denotes the player's usual team when he represented the Gentlemen (most at the time were MCC members).
 debut denotes the year of the player's debut appearance for the Gentlemen.
 final denotes the year of the player's final appearance for the Gentlemen.
 M denotes the number of matches in which the player represented the Gentlemen.
 runs denotes the total number of runs scored by the player in all his matches for the Gentlemen.
 HS denotes the highest score made by the player in one innings when batting for the Gentlemen (* signifies not out).
 wkts denotes the total number of wickets taken by the player in all his matches for the Gentlemen.
 BB denotes the best bowling performance by the player in one innings for the Gentlemen (e.g., 3–30 means he took 3 wickets in the innings and conceded 30 runs;  to 1840, runs conceded by bowlers are usually unknown, hence "?").
 players are initially listed according to the date of their debut for the Gentlemen.
 players in bold were known professionals who represented the Gentlemen as given men in order to handicap the Players.

List

See also
 List of Gentlemen v Players matches
 List of Gentlemen cricketers (1841–1962)
 List of Players cricketers (1806–1840)
 List of Players cricketers (1841–1962)

Notes and sources

English cricket in the 19th century
Gentlemen
1806
1806